Iran women's national goalball team is the women's national team of Iran.  Goalball is a team sport designed specifically for athletes with a vision impairment.  The team takes part in international competitions.

IBSA World Games

2007 São Paulo 

The team competed in the 2007 IBSA World Games, from 28 July 2007 to 8 August 2007, in São Paulo, Brazil.  The women's goalball competition included thirteen teams, including this one.  The competition was a 2008 Summer Paralympics qualifying event. Maryam Dousti was seventh in the competition in scoring with 13 points.

Regional championships 

The team competes in IBSA Asia goalball region, and from January 2010 became part of the IBSA Asia-Pacific goalball competition region.

2013 Beijing  

The team competed in the 2013 IBSA Asia Pacific Goalball Regional Championships, from 11 to 16 November 2013, in Beijing, China.  Of the six men's teams (Australia, China, Iran, Japan, Mongolia, Thailand), the team came ranked third, ahead of Australia.

2017 Bangkok  

The team competed in the 2017 IBSA Asia/Pacific Goalball Regional Championships, from Monday 21 to Saturday 26 August 2017, in the  Thai-Japan Sports Stadium, Din Daeng, Bangkok, Thailand.  There were seven men's and five women's teams. 

The team did not rank in the top four.

2022 Bahrain  

Due to the COVID-19 pandemic, the 2021 IBSA Goalball Asia-Pacific Regional Championships were moved from November 2021 to 21 March 2022 in Asan, South Korea.  The championships was finally held at the Bahrain Sports Federation for Disabilities Sports Centre, in Riffa, Bahrain from Monday 25 July 2022 to Friday 29 July 2022.  The top two teams of each division are eligible for the World Championships in December 2022.  

There were four women's teams: Australia, Iran, South Korea, Thailand.  They placed second in the round-robin, and third overall.

FESPIC Games

2006 Kuala Lumpur  

In 2006, the team participated in the ninth edition of the FESPIC Games held in Kuala Lumpur.  They were one of three teams competing, the other two being China and Japan.

Goal scoring by competition

Competitive history 
The table below contains individual game results for the team in international matches and competitions.

See also 

 Disabled sports 
 Iran at the Paralympics

References

Goalball women's
National women's goalball teams
Iran at the Paralympics
Goalball in Asia